Francis Brooks may refer to:
 Francis Gerard Brooks (1924–2010), Roman Catholic bishop in Northern Ireland
 Francis K. Brooks (born 1943), Vermont educator and politician